Geert Hoste (born 1 July 1960) is a Flemish cabaret performer. Between 1988 and 2016 he was known for his cabaret shows which poked fun at politics, the Belgian royal family and media stories. Annually these shows were broadcast on Flemish public television, traditionally on New Year's Day, and brought in high ratings.

Theater shows

 1988 Geert Hoste stand up comedy
 1990 Geert Hoste Vers lach
 1992 Geert Hoste Live wit
 1993 Geert Hoste Live zwart
 1994 Geert Hoste Koning
 1995 Geert Hoste Alleen
 1996 Geert Hoste Spreekt 1
 1997 Geert Hoste JA!
 1998 Geert Hoste 3000
 1999 Geert Hoste Sterk
 2000 Geert Hoste Verdorie
 2001 Geert Hoste Dwars
 2002 Geert Hoste Puur en Onversneden
 2003 Geert Hoste Hard
 2004 Geert Hoste Patat
 2005 Geert Hoste Staat
 2006 Geert Hoste Staat Verder
 2007 Geert Hoste Houdt Woord
 2008 Geert Hoste Regeert
 2009 Geert Hoste Beslist
 2010 Geert Hoste Vulkaan
 2011 Geert Hoste Kookt

Television shows

 1993 Sla je Slag (game show)
 1997 Geert Hoste Toerist (series)
 1998 O dierbaar België (docu-comedyserie, 13x)
 1999 Geert Hoste Redt het land (docu-comedyserie, 6x)
 2000 Geert Hoste en de lachende neger (docu-comedyserie, 6x)
 2001 Geert Hoste Histories (docu-comedy serie, 6x)
 2002 De leukste eeuw van Geert Hoste (10x)
 2003 Geert Hoste en de Modelstaat (current affairs programme, 6x)
 2003 Geert Hoste Eén man, Eén stem (electionsketch)
 2003 Geert Hoste staat model (10x)
 2004 Geert Hoste en het jaar van de Aap (10x)
 2005 Geert Hoste en het jaar van de Haan
 2006 Geert Hoste en het jaar van de Hond
 2007 Geert Hoste Compleet (12x)
 2008 Geert Hoste en het jaar van de Geit
 2009 Geert Hoste en het jaar van de Buffel

External links

1960 births
Living people
Belgian stand-up comedians
Entertainers from Bruges
Flemish cabaret
Belgian satirists
Belgian political satire